The Hiding Place is a 1971 book on the life of Corrie ten Boom, written by Ten Boom and John and Elizabeth Sherrill.

The idea for a book about Ten Boom's life began as the Sherrills were doing research for the book, God's Smuggler, about Ten Boom's fellow Dutchman, Andrew van der Bijl. Ten Boom was already in her mid-70s when the Sherrills first heard about her. She was one of van der Bijl's favourites traveling companions, and many of his recollections are about her. In the preface to the book, the Sherrills recount:

...his [Brother Andrew's] fascinating stories about her in Vietnam, where she had earned that most honourable title "Double-old Grandmother" - and in a dozen other Communist countries - came to mind so often that we finally had to hold up her hands to stop his flow of reminiscence. "We could never fit her into the book," we said. "She sounds like a book in herself." It's the sort of thing you say, not meaning anything.

The book was later made into a film of the same name, along with a comic book adaptation by Spire Christian Comics.

The title refers to both the physical hiding place where the Ten Boom family hid Jews from the Nazis and also to the Scriptural message found in Psalm 119:114: "Thou art my hiding place and my shield...."

Plot 
The book begins with the 'Ten Boom family' celebrating the 100th anniversary of the family business; they sell and repair watches under the family's elderly father, Casper ten Boom. The business takes up the ground floor of the family home, known as the Béjé. Casper lives with his unmarried daughters, Corrie, the narrator and a watchmaker herself, and Betsie, who takes care of the house. It seems as if everyone in the Dutch town of Haarlem has shown up to the party, including Corrie's sister Nollie, her brother Willem, and her nephews Peter and Kik. Willem, a minister in the Dutch Reformed Church, brings a Jewish man, who has just escaped from Germany. The man's beard has been burned off by some thugs, a grim reminder of what was happening just to the east of the Netherlands.

In the next few chapters, Corrie talks about her childhood, her infirm but glad-hearted mother, and the three aunts who once lived in the Béjé. She talks about the only man she ever loved, a young man named Karel, who ultimately married a woman from a rich family.

Eventually, both Nollie and Willem marry. After the deaths of Corrie's mother and aunts, Corrie, Betsie, and their father settle down into a pleasant domestic life. Then, in 1940, the Nazis invade the Netherlands.

The family has strong morals based on Christian beliefs and feel obligated to help the Jews in every way possible. The Béjé soon became the centre of a major anti-Nazi operation. Corrie, who had grown to think of herself as a middle-aged spinster, finds herself involved in black market operations, using stolen ration cards, and eventually hiding Jews in her own home.

Corrie suffers a moral crisis over the lying, theft, forgery and bribery that are necessary to keep the Jews that her family is hiding. Moreover, it is unlikely that her family would get away with helping Jews for long, as they had nowhere to hide them. The Dutch underground arranges for a secret room to be built in the Béjé so that the Jews would have a place to hide during an inevitable raid.

It is a constant struggle for Corrie to keep the Jews safe; she sacrifices her own safety and part of her own personal room to give constant safety to the Jews. Rolf, a police officer friend, trains her to be able to think clearly anytime when the Nazis invade her home and start to question her.

When a man asks Corrie to help his wife who had been arrested, Corrie agrees, but with misgivings. As it turns out, the man is a spy and the watch shop is raided. The entire family is arrested, along with the shop employees, but the Jews managed to stay hidden in the secret room.

Casper is now in his mid-80s and a Nazi official offers to let him go if he agrees to cause no more trouble. Casper does not agree and states that if he is set free, he will return home and help the first person who asks him for it. He is shipped to prison, and it is later learned that he had died ten days later.

Meanwhile, Corrie was sent to Scheveningen, a Dutch prison used by the Nazis for political prisoners, nicknamed '"Oranjehotel"', a hotel for people loyal to the House of Orange. She later learns that her sister is being held in another cell and that aside from her father, all of her other family members and friends have been released. A coded letter from Nollie reveals that the hidden Jews are safe. At Scheveningen, Corrie befriends a depressed Nazi officer, who arranges a brief meeting with her family under the pretense of reading Casper's will. Corrie is horrified to see how ill Willem is, as he contracted jaundice in prison and would die from it in 1946. Corrie also learns that her nephew, Kik, was captured while he worked for the Dutch underground. He is later killed, but the family does not learn that until 1953.

After four months at Scheveningen, Corrie and Betsie are transferred to Vught, a concentration camp for political prisoners in the Netherlands. Corrie is assigned to a factory that makes radios for aircraft. The work is not hard, and the prisoner-foreman, Mr. Moorman, is kind. Betsie, whose health is starting to fail, is sent to work sewing prison uniforms.

When a counteroffensive against the Nazis seems imminent, the prisoners are shipped by train to Germany, where they are imprisoned at Ravensbrück, a notorious women's concentration camp. The conditions there are hellish; both Corrie and Betsie are forced to perform backbreaking manual labour. There, Betsie's health completely fails. Throughout the ordeal, Corrie is amazed at her sister's faith. In every camp, the sisters use a hidden Bible to teach their fellow prisoners about Jesus.

In Ravensbrück, where there is only hatred and misery, Corrie finds it hard to look to Heaven. Betsie, however, shows a universal love for everyone: not only the prisoners but also the Nazis. Instead of feeling anger, she pities the Germans and is sorrowful that they were so blinded by hatred. She yearns to show them the love of Christ, but dies before the war was over. Corrie is later released because of a clerical error, but she is forced to stay in a hospital barracks while she recovers from edema. Corrie arrives back in the Netherlands by January 1945.

After the war, Corrie works with people who were damaged by the war, both the victims of the persecution and the Nazis themselves.

References

Sources 

1971 non-fiction books
Biographies adapted into films
Dutch culture
Collaborative non-fiction books
Personal accounts of the Holocaust
World War II memoirs